The 2018–19 Atlantic Coast Conference men's basketball season began with practices in October 2018, followed by the start of the 2018–19 NCAA Division I men's basketball season in November. Conference play started in late December 2018 and concluded in March with the 2019 ACC men's basketball tournament at the Spectrum Center in Charlotte, North Carolina. The season marks 65th season of Atlantic Coast Conference basketball.

Head coaches

Coaching changes 
 David Padgett was not retained as head coach of Louisville and was replaced by Chris Mack.
Kevin Stallings was fired as head coach of Pittsburgh and was replaced by Jeff Capel.

Coaches 

Notes:
 Year at school includes 2018–19 season.
 Overall and ACC records are from time at current school and are through the end the 2017–18 season.
 NCAA tournament appearances are from time at current school only.
 NCAA Final Fours and Championship include time at other schools

Preseason

Preseason watchlists
Below is a table of notable preseason watch lists.

Preseason polls

ACC preseason media poll

Coaches, players, and the media met at the Spectrum Center in Charlotte, North Carolina for a media day on October 24, 2018.  Players and coaches met the media, and coaches voted on the preseason conference poll and preseason All-ACC teams.  Results of the polls are shown below.

Preseason poll
First place votes shown in parenthesis.
 Duke (52) – 1709 
 Virginia (47) – 1699
 North Carolina (20) – 1641
 Syracuse (1) – 1268
 Virginia Tech – 1187
 Clemson – 1148
 Florida State – 1127
 NC State – 885
 Notre Dame – 859
 Miami – 816
 Louisville – 735
 Boston College– 568
 Georgia Tech – 324
 Wake Forest – 313
 Pittsburgh – 241

Preseason All-ACC teams

ACC preseason player of the year 
 Luke Maye – North Carolina (50)
 RJ Barrett – Duke (22)
 Zion Williamson – Duke (15)
 Tyus Battle – Syracuse (11)
 Ky Bowman – Boston College (7)
 Kyle Guy – Virginia (5)                       
 De'Andre Hunter – Virginia (4)
 Ty Jerome – Virginia (2)
 Justin Robinson – Virginia Tech (2)
 Cam Reddish – Duke (1)
 T. J. Gibbs – Notre Dame (1)
 Jaylen Hoard – Wake Forest (1)

ACC preseason rookie of the year
 RJ Barrett – Duke (66)
 Zion Williamson – Duke (43)
 Cam Reddish – Duke (4)
 Jaylen Hoard – Wake Forest (3)
 Coby White – North Carolina (2)
 Jalen Carey – Syracuse (1)
 Nate Laszewski – Notre Dame (1)
 Jairus Hamilton – Boston College (1)

Regular season

Rankings

 Notes: The week 2 Coaches Poll was released on the same date as the week 3 AP poll.  No Coaches poll was released on the date when the week 2 AP Poll was released. The AP poll does not release a final poll after the NCAA tournament, where as the Coaches Poll does.

Conference matrix
This table summarizes the head-to-head results between teams in conference play. Each team will play 18 conference games, and at least 1 against each opponent.

Player of the week
Throughout the conference regular season, the Atlantic Coast Conference offices named one or two Players of the week and one or two Rookies of the week.

Records against other conferences
2018–19 records against non-conference foes through games played on February 2, 2019. Records shown for regular season only.

Postseason

ACC tournament

  2019 Atlantic Coast Conference basketball tournament, Spectrum Center, Charlotte, NC.

NCAA tournament 

The ACC had seven teams selected to the NCAA tournament.  This was tied for second overall with the SEC.  The ACC's three number one seeded teams ties an all-time record.  The previous time one conference had three number one seeds was in 2009, when the Big East accomplished the feat.

National Invitation tournament

Honors and awards

All-Americans

To earn "consensus" status, a player must win honors based on a point system computed from the four different all-America teams. The point system consists of three points for first team, two points for second team and one point for third team. No honorable mention or fourth team or lower are used in the computation. The top five totals plus ties are first team and the next five plus ties are second team.

ACC Awards

NBA draft

The Atlantic Coast Conference had a record six players selected in the lottery picks of the NBA Draft.  Their ten first round selections tied the record for most first round selections from a conference in a single year.  Also, the ACC had the most selections of any conference in the draft (thirteen total).  The ACC also became the first conference to have five top-ten picks in the modern draft era (since 1966).

Attendance

References